Mehmet Taş (born 20 March 1991) is a Turkish footballer who plays for Kocaelispor.

References

1991 births
Sportspeople from Mersin
Living people
Turkish footballers
Association football midfielders
MKE Ankaragücü footballers
Ankara Demirspor footballers
Hatayspor footballers
Nazilli Belediyespor footballers
Mersin İdman Yurdu footballers
Adana Demirspor footballers
Gençlerbirliği S.K. footballers
Denizlispor footballers
Giresunspor footballers
Kocaelispor footballers
Süper Lig players
TFF First League players
TFF Second League players